The Rural Municipality of Newcombe No. 260 is a rural municipality (RM) in the Canadian province of Saskatchewan within Census Division No. 8 and  Division No. 3. It is located in the west-central portion of the province.

History 
The RM of Newcombe No. 260 incorporated as a rural municipality on December 11, 1911. It is named after Allan Simpson Newcombe who played a leadership role in establishing the Boston Colony of immigrants from Massachusetts.

Heritage properties
There is one designated heritage property in the RM.
Ukrainian Catholic Parish of St. John the Baptist - Constructed in 1944 the church is located 20 km southwest of Kindersley.  The site also contains a one-room school that was related to the site in 1961 for use as a church hall.  Religious services were last conducted at the church in 1986.

Geography

Communities and localities 

The following unincorporated communities are within the RM.

Localities
 Dankin
 Glidden (dissolved as a village, October 19, 2000)
 Inglenook
 Madison (dissolved as a village, February 1, 1998)
 Sandgren

Demographics 

Government 
The RM of Newcombe No. 260 is governed by an elected municipal council and an appointed administrator that meets on the second Thursday of every month. The reeve of the RM is Ken McBride while its administrator is Monica Buddecke. The RM's office is located in Glidden.

Transportation 
The RM is at the intersection of Highway 21 and Highway 44. The Lemsford Ferry is located within the RM.

References 

Newcombe No. 260, Saskatchewan
Newcombe